Leonard Dubkin (1905-1972) was an American writer and naturalist from Chicago.

He is known for his books and newspaper columns on the subject of wildlife found in urban locations.

Early life
Leonard Dubkin was born in 1905 in Odessa, Russia Empire. He came to the United States with his parents in 1907. The oldest of seven with a chronically ill father, his family relied on Jewish charity organizations. In the eighth grade, Leonard dropped out of school to work and take care of his family. By the age of 12 he was taking meticulous notes on the life histories of butterflies and moths. He took an interest in nature from an early age and frequently contributed to the children's pages of the Chicago Tribune. The social worker Jane Addams took an interest in him and gave him his first typewriter. This paved his way to a career in journalism.

In 1934 he married actress Muriel Schwartz and created a local talent directory for radio and stage actors. This successful business allowed him to write his novels, review books for the New York Times, and correspond with other nature writers such as Rachel Carson, Euell Gibbons, and Edwin Way Teale.

Often featured in his books and columns is his daughter Pauline Yearwood, herself a successful journalist and the managing editor for the Chicago Jewish News.

Career
Dubkin had difficulty committing to the topics assigned by editors in favor of observing nature. En route to cover a plane crash at Midway Airport, he stopped to observe a cricket singing in a field. By the time he got to the scene of the accident, all the survivors had been taken away. He missed another story by exploring a church tower where pigeons went to nest or die. On a pivotal case in which he was sent to interview a murder suspect, he became distracted by squirrels nesting in the walls of the suspect's home. Upon returning to the office without a scoop, he was fired.

In the following period of unemployment and occasional dispiriting office jobs, he took to observing nature closely instead of looking for work. Among the creatures he observed in Chicago were ballooning spiders, bats, crickets, Polyphemus Moths and Cecropia moths.

He eventually found work as an amateur naturalist, writing about his subject in a newspaper column with Lerner Newspapers and in his own books.

He authored six books, now out of print, about the natural history of Chicago, arguing for the preservation of secret places, small parks, and urban wildlife. He wrote a column called "The Birds and Bees" in the Lerner Newspapers, published between 1950 and 1972. During this time there was little to no nature writing taking place in Chicago - conservation efforts focused on larger suburban spaces, such as forest preserves.

He became a champion of everyday wildlife and promoted the idea that wildlife worth observing was not necessarily exotic.

A city park in Chicago is named for him, Dubkin Park, where he often ate lunch while working for the Lerner Newspapers. The park has a community garden, many species of native and non-native plants, and a blank wall along the CTA tracks. Before she died in 2016, his daughter planted a peony in his memory at the park. It is still there.

Bibliography
 The Murmur of Wings (1944)
 Enchanted Streets (1947)
 The White Lady (1952)
 Wolf Point (1953)
 The Natural History of a Yard (1955)
 My Secret Places (1972)

References

1905 births
1972 deaths
American naturalists
American non-fiction outdoors writers
American conservationists
Writers from Chicago
20th-century American non-fiction writers
20th-century American male writers
American male non-fiction writers
20th-century naturalists
Emigrants from the Russian Empire to the United States